The Belgrave line is a commuter railway line in the city of Melbourne, Victoria, Australia. The line runs from Flinders Street station in central Melbourne to Belgrave station in the east, serving 31 stations via Burnley, Box Hill, Ringwood, and Upper Ferntree Gully. Beyond Belgrave, the narrow-gauge line has been restored as the Puffing Billy Railway, which runs tourist services to the original terminus of Gembrook. The line operates for approximately 19 hours a day (from approximately 5:00 am to around 12:00 am) with 24 hour service available on Friday and Saturday nights. During peak hour, headways of up to 15 minutes are operated with services every 20-30 minutes during off-peak hours. Trains on the Belgrave line run with a two three-car formations of X'Trapolis 100 trainsets.

Sections of the Belgrave line opened as early as 1889, with the line fully extended and re-gauged to Belgrave by 1962. The line was built to connect Melbourne and Ringwood with the rural towns of Bayswater, Boronia, Upper Ferntree Gully, and Belgrave, amongst others. 

Since the 2010s, due to the heavily utilised infrastructure of the Belgrave line, significant improvements and upgrades have been made. Different packages of works have upgraded the corridor to replace sleepers, upgrading signalling technology, the introduction of new rolling stock, and the removal 7 out of the 9 remaining level crossings.

History

19th century 
A rail branch was constructed from Ringwood to Upper Ferntree Gully in December 1889. A narrow-gauge  line was opened from Upper Ferntree Gully to Gembrook station in December 1900, the second of four experimental narrow-gauge lines built by the Victorian Railways. These two lines would become joined and standardised to form the Belgrave railway line in the 20th century.

20th century 
In 1921, the narrow-gauge section from Upper Ferntree Gully to Belgrave was converted to automatic signalling, the first such instance on single track in the Southern Hemisphere. This section was then reverted to Staff and Ticket safeworking in 1930. Electrification of the railway to Upper Ferntree Gully was implemented in November 1925.

Following a landslide in 1953, the narrow-gauge line was formally closed in April 1954, although services resumed as far as Belgrave for some "farewell specials", and then for the Puffing Billy Preservation Society until services ceased again in February 1958. 

The line was partly duplicated between Bayswater and Lower Ferntree Gully (now Ferntree Gully) in February 1957.

The closing of the narrow-gauge line to Gembrook enabled the first stage of its planned rebuilding to Emerald as part of the suburban electrified system to proceed. This first stage, as far as Belgrave, of the new, broad-gauge, electrified extension opened in February 1962. It initially operated on the Staff and Ticket system, but was converted to automatic signalling in March 1964, with the section from Ferntree Gully to Upper Ferntree Gully being converted the following day. Ringwood to Bayswater was converted to automatic signalling in June 1974, as was Bayswater to Ferntree Gully in July 1977. In December 1982, Ringwood to Bayswater was duplicated.

The Comeng trains were introduced to the Melbourne railway system in 1981 alongside the opening of the City Loop. Initially, along with the Belgrave line, they were only allowed to operate on the Alamein, Dandenong, Glen Waverley and Lilydale lines, due to the width of the trains at 3.05 metres wide.

21st century 

A 2007 restructure of train ticketing in Melbourne involved the removal of Zone 3, with Zone 3 stations being re-classified to Zone 2. This brought the cost of train fares down, improving system accessibility to the public.

In April 2016, plans to potentially run a regular revenue Tait set service on the Belgrave line was announced. This came following La Trobe MP Jason Wood's push for the idea as part of the greater "Puffing Billy master plan". The Tait service would be aimed at tourists visiting Puffing Billy. In November 2016, $1 million was committed to restoring a Tait set currently stored at the Newport Workshops. The Tait service is expected to originate at Flinders Street station as a direct service to Belgrave bypassing the City Loop.

Future

Level Crossing Removals 

The Level Crossing Removal Project has announced the removal of 7 level crossings between the city and Ferntree Gully station, to be completed in stages from 2016 to 2025. In 2016, 2 level crossings were removed at Mountain Highway and Scoresby Road, Bayswater, through the rail under method. These two removals also included a rebuilt Bayswater station and upgraded stabling facilities. A further two crossings were removed at Blackburn Road, Blackburn, and Hetherdale Road, Ringwood in January 2017. Both of these removals involved lowering the rail line under the roads with a rebuilt Hetherdale station built as part of the project. Union and Mont Albert Roads have also been removed by lowering the rail line in May 2023. The removals also included closing Mont Albert and Surry Hills stations with a new station built in-between called "Union." The final crossing to be removed on the corridor will be at Bedford Road in Ringwood by lowering the rail line in 2025. At the end of these removals, the Belgrave line will be fully level crossing free between the city and Ferntree Gully station, with crossings at Alpine St, Ferntree Gully, and Hilltop Rd, Upper Ferntree Gully, not currently slatered for removal.

Network and operations

Services 
Services on the Belgrave line operates from approximately 5:00 am to around 12:00 daily. In general, during peak hours, train frequency is ~7 minutes on the Ringwood corridor (combined with the Lilydale line) and 15 minutes in the AM peak on the Belgrave Line while during non-peak hours the frequency is reduced to 20–30 minutes throughout the entire route. During certain periods of the day, services operate as a shuttle to Ringwood due to lower demand. On Friday nights and weekends, services run 24 hours a day, with 60 minute frequencies available outside of normal operating hours.

Train services on the Belgrave line are also subjected to maintenance and renewal works, usually on selected Fridays and Saturdays. Shuttle bus services are provided throughout the duration of works for affected commuters.

Stopping patterns 
Legend — Station status
 ◼ Premium Station – Station staffed from first to last train
 ◻ Host Station – Usually staffed during morning peak, however this can vary for different stations on the network.

Legend — Stopping patternsSome services do not operate via the City Loop
 ● – All trains stop
 ◐ – Some services do not stop
 ▼ – Only outbound trains stop
 | – Trains pass and do not stop

Operators 
The Belgrave line has had a total of 6 operators since its opening in 1889. The majority of operations throughout its history have been government run: from its first service in 1889 until the 1997 privatisation of Melbourne's rail network, three different government operators have run the line. These operators, Victorian Railways, the Metropolitan Transit Authority, and the Public Transport Corporation have a combined operational length of 108 years. In comparison, the three private operators, Hillside Trains, Connex Melbourne, and Metro Trains Melbourne have had a combined operational period of  years.

Route 

The Belgrave line forms a mostly curved route from the Melbourne central business district to its terminus in Belgrave. Finally, the line narrows to two tracks between Box Hill and Ferntree Gully before narrowing to a single track to its terminus. After Ferntree Gully passing loops and island platforms are present at Upper Ferntree Gully, Upwey, and Belgrave. After departing from its terminus at Flinders Street, the Belgrave line traverses both flat and hilly country with some curves (more towards the end of the line) and fairly significant earthworks for parts of the line. Sections of the line have been elevated or lowered into a cutting to eliminate level crossings. Despite some removals, there are a small number of level crossings still present with no current plans to remove them.

The line follows the same alignment as the Alamein, Glen Waverley, and Lilydale lines with the four services splitting onto different routes at Burnley. The Alamein, Belgrave, and Lilydale services continue till the Alamein line splits off at Camberwell, with the two services continuing together till Ringwood. After departing Ringwood station, the Belgrave line heads south with the Lilydale line heading in an eastern direction. Almost all of the rail line goes through built-up suburbs, however, the rail line becomes peri-urban towards its terminus in Belgrave.

Stations 
The line serves 31 stations across  of track. The stations are a mix of elevated, lowered, underground, and ground level designs. Underground stations are present in the City Loop and Box Hill, with the majority of elevated and lowered stations being constructed as part of level crossing removals.

Infrastructure

Rolling stock 
The Belgrave line uses X'Trapolis 100 electric multiple unit (EMU) trains operating in a two three-car configuration, with three doors per side on each carriage and can accommodate of up to 432 seated passengers in each six car configuration. The trains were originally built between 2002 and 2004 as well as between 2009 and 2020 with a total of 212 three-car sets constructed. The trains are shared with 7 other metropolitan train lines and have been in service since 2003.

Alongside the passenger trains, Belgrave line tracks and equipment are maintained by a fleet of engineering trains. The four types of engineering trains are: the shunting train; designed for moving trains along non-electrified corridors and for transporting other maintenance locomotives, for track evaluation; designed for evaluating track and its condition, the overhead inspection train; designed for overhead wiring inspection, and the infrastructure evaluation carriage designed for general infrastructure evaluation. Most of these trains are repurposed locomotives previously used by V/Line, Metro Trains, and the Southern Shorthaul Railroad.

Accessibility 
In compliance with the Disability Discrimination Act of 1992, all stations that are new-built or rebuilt are fully accessible and comply with these guidelines. Half of stations on the corridor are fully accessible, however, there are some stations that haven't been upgraded to meet these guidelines. These stations do feature ramps, however, they have a gradient greater than 1 in 14. Stations that are fully accessible feature ramps that have a gradient less than 1 in 14, have at-grade paths, or feature lifts. These stations typically also feature tactile boarding indicators, independent boarding ramps, wheelchair accessible myki barriers, hearing loops, and widened paths.

Projects improving station accessibility have included the Level Crossing Removal Project, which involves station rebuilds and upgrades, and individual station upgrade projects. These works have made significant strides in improving network accessibility, with more than 58% of Belgrave line stations classed as fully accessible. Future station upgrade projects will continue to increase the number of fully accessible stations overtime.

Signalling 
The Belgrave line uses three position signals with automatic block signaling(ABS) and automatic and track control(ATC) systems. Three position signals was first introduced on the line in 1919, with the final section of the line converted to the new type of signal by 1960.  Automatic and track control is used with the centre line between Burnley and Box Hill, and between Ferntree Gully and the line's terminus in Belgrave.

See also 

 Ringwood–Belgrave Rail Trail

References

External links
 Belgrave line timetable
 Network map
 

Railway lines in Melbourne
Railway lines opened in 1889
2 ft 6 in gauge railways in Australia
5 ft 3 in gauge railways in Australia
1889 establishments in Australia
Transport in the City of Yarra
Public transport routes in the City of Melbourne (LGA)
Transport in the City of Boroondara
Transport in the City of Whitehorse
Transport in the City of Maroondah
Transport in the City of Knox
Transport in the Shire of Yarra Ranges